The Ship of Condemned Women (Italian: La nave delle donne maledette) is a 1953 Italian historical adventure-melodrama film written and directed by Raffaello Matarazzo and starring Kerima, May Britt and Ettore Manni. It is loosely based on the novel Histoire de 130 femmes by Léon Gozlan.

The film's sets were designed by the art director Piero Filippone.

Synopsis
A young woman wrongly convicted or murder is sentenced to serve in a penal colony, departs on a ship carrying a hundred female prisoners.

Cast 

Kerima as Rosario
May Britt as Consuelo
Ettore Manni as Da Silva
Tania Weber as Isabella
Gualtiero Tumiati as Pietro Silveris 
Olga Solbelli as Anita
Luigi Tosi as Fernandez
Marcella Rovena as Nora
Elvy Lissiak as Carmen
Romolo Costa as Manuel
Eduardo Ciannelli as Michele 
 Milly
Giovanna Ralli 
Flo Sandon's
Anna Arena

References

External links

1953 films
1950s Italian-language films
1950s adventure drama films
Italian adventure drama films
Films directed by Raffaello Matarazzo
Films scored by Nino Rota
Films based on French novels
Seafaring films
Women in prison films
Films set in the 18th century
Italian historical adventure films
1950s historical adventure films
Minerva Film films
1953 drama films
Melodrama films
1950s Italian films